The following article presents a summary of the 1999 football (soccer) season in Brazil, which was the 98th season of competitive football in the country.

Campeonato Brasileiro Série A

Quarterfinals

Semifinals

Final

Corinthians declared as the Campeonato Brasileiro champions by aggregate score of 4-3.

Relegation
The four clubs with the lowest average points in the 1998 and 1999 seasons, which are Botafogo-SP, Juventude, Paraná and Gama, were relegated to the following year's second level.

Campeonato Brasileiro Série B

Goiás declared as the Campeonato Brasileiro Série B champions.

Promotion
The two best placed teams in the final stage of the competition, which are Goiás and Santa Cruz, were promoted to the following year's first level.

Relegation
The six worst placed teams, which are União São João, Criciúma, Paysandu, Tuna Luso, América-RN and Desportiva, were relegated to the following year's third level.

Campeonato Brasileiro Série C

Fluminense declared as the Campeonato Brasileiro Série C champions.

Promotion
The two best placed teams in the final stage of the competition, which are Fluminense and São Raimundo, were promoted to the following year's second level.

Copa do Brasil

The Copa do Brasil final was played between Juventude and Botafogo.

Juventude declared as the cup champions by aggregate score of 2-1.

Regional and state championship champions

Regional championship champions

State championship champions

(1)The second leg of the final was not played, and in January 2005, the Bahia Football Federation declared both clubs, Bahia and Vitória, as champions of the competition.

Youth competition champions

Other competition champions

Brazilian clubs in international competitions

Brazil national team
The following table lists all the games played by the Brazil national football team in official competitions and friendly matches during 1999.

Women's football

Brazil women's national football team
The following table lists all the games played by the Brazil women's national football team in official competitions and friendly matches during 1999.

The Brazil women's national football team competed in the following competitions in 1999:

Domestic competition champions

References

 Brazilian competitions at RSSSF
 1999 Brazil national team matches at RSSSF
 1997-1999 Brazil women's national team matches at RSSSF

 
Seasons in Brazilian football